The House of Dreams is a terraced house in East Dulwich transformed into the personal art museum of former textile designer and art director Stephen Wright. Wright has lived in the house since 1982, and began developing it "just as something decorative" in 1998. The museum is dedicated to his dreams, life and love 
and as a monument to his dead partner and deceased parents. Wright worked on the museum in secret until the 2010s, when he began to open it to the public several days each year.

Wright, a fashion and textile designer, has been influenced by Jarvis Cocker's work on outsider art, Bodan Litnianski and the folk arts of Mexico, South America and Asia. He has shown his work at the Halle St. Pierre in Paris and the museum is bequeathed to The National Trust. The museum is the subject of a BBC documentary.

The entire ground floor, gardens and exterior has been turned into one sculpture, with rooms subdivided and every inch of the ceiling, walls, floors and space taken up. Wright lives in a flat upstairs, which is currently habitable but he aims to complete the transformation of the entire house before he dies.

Gallery

References

External links

 

Museums in the London Borough of Southwark
Outsider art
Art museums and galleries in London
Visionary environments